Brain-Washing: A Synthesis of the Russian Textbook on Psychopolitics is a Red Scare, black propaganda book, published by the Church of Scientology in 1955 about brainwashing.  L. Ron Hubbard authored the text and alleged it was the secret manual written by Lavrentiy Beria, the Soviet secret police chief, in 1936.  In this text, many of the practices Scientology opposes (psychiatry teaching, brain surgery, electroshock, income tax) are described as Communist-led conspiracies, and its technical content is limited to suggesting more of these practices on behalf of the Soviet Union.  The text also describes the Church of Scientology as the greatest threat to Communism.

Hubbard's text is a relative copy of the 1953, best-selling, non-fiction book Brain-washing in Red China by famed journalist Edward Hunter.  This text is also listed in They Never Said It: A Book of Fake Quotes..., where the true author is identified as "the notorious founder of Scientology."  Hubbard sent the material to the FBI, and one unidentified FBI agent gave this review: "[He] appears mental." When the FBI ignored him, Hubbard wrote again stating that Soviet agents had, on three occasions, attempted to hire him to work against the United States, and were upset about his refusal, and that one agent specifically attacked him using electroshock as a weapon.

Authorship: L. Ron Hubbard and Scientology

It says that it is a transcript of a speech on the use of psychiatry as a means of social control, given by Lavrenty Beria in the Soviet Union in 1950. However L. Ron Hubbard Jr., estranged son of Scientology founder L. Ron Hubbard, stated: 
"Dad wrote every word of it. Barbara, Bryan, and my wife typed the manuscript off his dictation." 
Hubbard's former editor, John Sanborn, confirmed Hubbard Jr.'s testimony.

The Hubbard Association of Scientologists International published the booklet in an emergency basis in 1955. Hubbard tried to present the Federal Bureau of Investigation with a copy, but the Bureau expressed skepticism about the document's authenticity.  CIA operative Edward Hunter called the book a hoax, while the evaluator at the Operations Coordinating Board of President Dwight D. Eisenhower's National Security Council thought the writer of the booklet seemed to have a superior expertise on the subject.

In 1963, the Australian Board of Inquiry regarded the book as written by Hubbard, something that neither Hubbard nor the Church of Scientology's HASI Hubbard Association of Scientologists International refuted at the time.

According to Massimo Introvigne, critics of Scientology attribute the Brainwashing manual to Hubbard because of the claim that it was later used to practice actual brainwashing in the church. Hubbard, who was strongly opposed to psychiatry, denounced brainwashing in some of his writing.

Content

Content and the Church of Scientology

Far from being a technical guide, the Brain-Washing book is a generalist text, that abstractly discusses power, violence, coercion, and means of social control.  Beria allegedly describes the following as Communist subversive activities directed from Moscow: the Vienna Psychoanalytic Society, psychology professors, child labor laws, psychiatric wards, psychedelic drugs (of note: LSD, peyote, mescaline), brain surgery, electric shock therapy, and the 1909 Income Tax Law of the United States.  Incidentally, these are many issues that the Church of Scientology opposes.

An example of this generalized style can be found in chapter 6, where a relatively uninformed technique of control is described as...

"As an example of this, we find an individual refusing to obey and being struck. His refusal to obey is now less vociferous. He is struck again, and his resistance is lessened once more. He is hammered and pounded again and again, until, at length, his only thought is direct and implicit obedience to that person from whom the force has emanated."

According to the journalist Tony Ortega, the primary thesis of the work was "how to use psychiatry and psychology to carry out a communist takeover of the West," with critics and active communists calling it a "crude and laughable forgery," and Edward Hunter, author of Brainwashing In China, "described it as a fictional and inferior version of his own [book]."

In addition, the Church of Scientology is listed as the greatest enemy to Communism: "[The communist] operative should also spare no expense in smashing out of existence, by whatever means, any actual healing group, such as... Church of Scientology."  The Church of Scientology is mentioned 5 times, but the Catholic Church is only mentioned 2 times. The Eastern Orthodox Church, which was the dominant religious belief in the Soviet Union at the time, is not mentioned at all.

Authorship revealed

The book has the Communist Beria allegedly using obvious phrases that were clearly invented by L. Ron Hubbard, such as "thinkingness," "pain-drug-hypnosis,", or "psycho-political technology" (i.e. "religious technology"), and making an unlikely mention of Dianetics side by side with Christian Science and Catholicism as major worldwide "healing groups". Modern versions of the book do not include these Hubbardisms. Nick Redfern, a researcher studying Freedom of Information Act requests and FBI files, has written "the document [the brain-washing manual] is filled with what is clearly evidence of Hubbard's own writing style."

In this 1955 text, the alleged author states that income tax is "a Marxist principle smoothly slid into Capitalistic framework in 1909 in the United States," and in 1956, only a year later, L. Ron Hubbard wrote a rather similar statement under his own name, saying that mankind was so desperate that he "will buy almost any ideology whether it is communism or druidism. He will buy the garbage of Marx and even write it unsuspectingly into the United States Constitution under the heading of 'Income Tax.' He will seek solutions to his overpowering problems from indigestible sources such as Russian psychiatry or Wundtian German psychology, neither one of which was intended to free Man or to give him understanding and which were intended only to enslave and debase."

The final results of a 1965 Australian investigation called the Anderson Report declared:
"The Board is not concerned to find that the scientology techniques are brainwashing techniques as practised, so it is understood, in some communist-controlled countries. Scientology techniques are, nevertheless, a kind of brainwashing ... The astonishing feature of Scientology is that its techniques and propagation resemble very closely those set out in a book entitled Brain-washing, advertised and sold by the [Hubbard Association of Scientologists International]."

Kenneth Goff involvement 

Some (influenced by Morris Kominsky) suggest that the author was the anti-semitic, Christian Identity minister Kenneth Goff, who similarly suggested that UFOs were a communist conspiracy in 1951.  Several paper versions of the book list Goff as the author, while a number of publishers avoid the difficulty of authorship by listing the author as "anonymous."  The connection between Goff and Hubbard is uncertain, although Nick Redfern indicates that Goff was monitored by the FBI because he was becoming friends with Hubbard.

While L. Ron Hubbard had distributed a copy to the FBI, Goff went even further: he distributed copies to congressmen and politicians, alleging that the Alaska Mental Health Enabling Act was a Communist conspiracy, nicknaming the legislation the "Siberia Bill,"  although Goff also used the phrase "mental Siberia."

Goff alleged that the purpose of the Alaska bill was to create "a prison camp under the guise of mental health for everyone who raises their voice against Communism and the hidden government operating in our nation."  Selections of the book were read into the Congressional Record, under the title of "Murder of Human Minds," in which Goff decried the book, but also stated that its methods allowed "unlimited sexual opportunities... over the bodies and minds of helpless patients," and that anyone could purchase a copy for $1 directly from Goff himself.

See also

 Red Scare : Anti-Communist hysteria.
 Black Propaganda : Faked propaganda by political or other organizations.
 The Protocols of the Elders of Zion : An anti-semitic, black propaganda document, allegedly written by Jews, about how they are going to control the world.

Notes

References

 Introvigne, Massimo (2005). "L. Ron Hubbard, Kenneth Goff, and the 'Brain-Washing Manual' of 1955", CESNUR (Centro Studi sulle Nuove Religioni = Center for Studies on New Religions), www.cesnur.org
 (includes scanned images of many primary documents relating to the book, such as an FBI report on it, and some of Mr Hubbard's correspondence regarding it)

External links
  The Brainwashing Manual at warrior.xenu.ca
 The Brainwashing Manual at The Online Books Page
  Brainwashing Manual Parallels in Scientology' by Brian Ambry

1955 non-fiction books
Books published by the Church of Scientology
Literary forgeries
Works of unknown authorship
Anti-communism in the United States